Osama Orabi (born 25 January 1962) is an Egyptian retired professional footballer who played as a midfielder.

Playing career

Early career
As a 13-year-old boy, Orabi attempted to join Al Ahly in 1975, but did not succeed. He unsuccessfully tried out once again at Al-Ahly in 1978. In 1981, he trained for two weeks with the first team of Arab Contractors but failed to impress the technical staff to sign him.

Encouraged by a friend named Abdul Moneim Muhammad Ali, Orabi was introduced to Ahmed Maher, Al-Ahly U-21 Manager. Maher decided to attach Orabi to the team in 1982.

Al-Ahly
Orabi first appearance with Al-Ahly's first team was in 1982–83 season against Olympic Alexandria, when Mahmoud El-Gohary was Al-Ahly manager and Abdel-Aziz Abdel Shafi was the Football Director. Orabi was introduced as a substitute for Mokhtar Mokhtar in the last 20 minutes of the match that was played in Alexandria. Al-Ahly won 6–0 as Zakaria Nasef scored 3 goals,  Fawzi Scotty 2 goals, and Mokhtar Mokhtar 1 goal.

Orabi's professional football career began in the 1983–84 season and ended in the 1998–99 season. During this 16 seasons span, Orabi won 28 different championship titles with Al-Ahly. He achieved an unprecedented record for any player by winning the football league 10 times during his career.

National team
Orabi participated in the 1990 FIFA World Cup in Italy and played one of Egypt's three matches in the competition. He played the full match against Ireland, which ended in a 0–0 draw. The match was moderated by Belgian referee Marcel van Langenhove and took place in June 1990 in the city of Palermo.

Coaching career
After his retirement, Osama Orabi became the trainer of Al-Ahly's first team during the 2001–02 Egyptian Premier League season. Al-Ahly's technical staff at the time included the Portuguese manager Manuel Jose, the General coach Mokhtar Mokhtar, and the coach Hossam El-Badry in addition to Orabi. Al-Ahly won the National League Champions Cup and the African Super Cup under this technical staff management.

Osama Orabi raised to the first man position as he became the manager of Al-Sekka Al-Hadid and later Gasco in the Egyptian Second Division. On 6 June 2010, El-Entag El-Harby (a.k.a. Military  Production) reached an agreement with Orabi to become the team manager with a one-season contract. Orabi will be leading El-Entag El-Harby in its second season in the Egyptian Premier League in its history.

Honours

Club
 Al-Ahly
 Egyptian Premier League: 10
 1984–85, 1985–86, 1986–87, 1988–89, 1993–94, 1994–95, 1995–96, 1996–97, 1997–98, and 1998–99
 Egyptian cup: 8
 1983, 1984, 1985, 1989, 1991, 1992, 1993,and 1996.
 CAF Champions League: 1
 1987
 African Cup Winners' Cup: 4
 1984, 1985, 1986, and 1993
 Arab Cup Winners' Cup: 1
 1994–95
 Arab Club Champions Cup: 1
 1996
 Arab Super Cup: 2
 1997–98, 1998–99
 Afro-Asian Cup: 1
 1989

References

External links
Osama Orabi at Footballdatabase

1962 births
Living people
Egyptian footballers
Egypt international footballers
Association football central defenders
Al Ahly SC players
1990 FIFA World Cup players
1988 African Cup of Nations players
Egyptian Premier League players